Robert Oxley is a British public relations officer and government appointee who was selected by Boris Johnson to serve as Downing Street Press Secretary from 24 July 2019.

Career 
Oxley worked at the online food delivery company Deliveroo and for James Starkie, a former advisor to Michael Gove and Dominic Raab. Oxley appeared as an advocate of the Bedroom tax in a debate with journalist and Labour Party activist Owen Jones on behalf of the TaxPayers' Alliance in 2013. 

Oxley formerly served as an advisor to Priti Patel and Michael Fallon. Along with former-Director of Communications Lee Cain, Oxley worked as a press officer on the Vote Leave campaign.

Oxley was appointed Downing Street Press Secretary by Boris Johnson upon the start of his premiership on 24 July 2019.

On 11 December 2019, a day before the general election, Oxley was filmed blocking a reporter from Good Morning Britain and swearing at him. The reporter was attempting to interview Prime Minister Boris Johnson.

Oxley served as a special adviser at the Foreign, Commonwealth and Development Office beginning in March 2020. In September 2021 he moved to work for Culture Secretary Nadine Dorries.

References

Living people
British political consultants
Year of birth missing (living people)